Sergei Valeryevich Zelenov (born 10 October 1980) is a former Russian professional football player.

Club career
He played two seasons in the Russian Football National League for FC Metallurg Krasnoyarsk.

References

External links

1980 births
Sportspeople from Barnaul
Living people
Russian footballers
Association football midfielders
FC Yenisey Krasnoyarsk players
FC Dynamo Barnaul players
FC Novokuznetsk players
FC Amur Blagoveshchensk players